Hellas Sat Consortium Ltd (Hellas Sat) is the owner and a wholesaler of capacity and services of the Greek/Cypriot Hellas Sat 2 satellite, an Astrium Eurostar E2000+, which was launched successfully on 13 May 2003 to the 39th eastern meridian orbital position in the geostationary satellite orbit. On 29 June 2017 the Hellas Sat 3 was launched successfully to replace Hellas Sat 2.

Hellas Sat has developed a network of strategically located telecommunication partners with Digital Video Broadcasting platforms, carrying over 100 television channels, and Internet protocol-based services through its two fixed beams over Europe, and two steerable beams over the Middle East and South Africa. It offers high-power, direct-to-home transmissions as well as occasional video feeds and Internet access services.

Satellite 

Hellas Sat 2 is an ASTRIUM Eurostar 2000+ platform spacecraft at orbital position 39° east. It was launched on 13 May 2003, and has an expected lifetime of 15 years. It has 30+8 (redundant) Ku band 36 MHz transponders

Launch Consultants 

RPC Telecom acted as the International Telecommunication Union filing and frequency coordination consultant, while Petrosat WLL was the launch consultant.

Television and radio services 

One of Hellas Sat's strategic partners is Satellite Telecommunications Network (STN), which offers comprehensive television and/or radio channel distribution services. STN offers standard-definition television (STDV) and/or high-definition television (HDTV) play-out services, SDTV and/or HDTV turnaround services as well as encryption, subtitling, and other services. STN was also behind the transmission of Euro1080-HD1 on Hellas-Sat-2, Europe's first HDTV channel.

References

External links 
 Hellas SAT Space Center  Archive link, 20 March 2021
 Hellas-Sat Official web-site
 STN Ltd. TV/Radio Teleport and Up-link station
 
 IMS Official provider's site
 RPC Telecom launch consultant
 Petrosat WLL launch consultant

Telecommunications companies of Greece
Greek brands